The Cantor–Bernstein–Schroeder theorem of set theory has a counterpart for measurable spaces, sometimes called the Borel Schroeder–Bernstein theorem, since measurable spaces are also called Borel spaces. This theorem, whose proof is quite easy, is instrumental when proving that two measurable spaces are isomorphic. The general theory of standard Borel spaces contains very strong results about isomorphic measurable spaces, see Kuratowski's theorem. However, (a) the latter theorem is very difficult to prove, (b) the former theorem is satisfactory in many important cases (see Examples), and (c) the former theorem is used in the proof of the latter theorem.

The theorem
Let  and  be measurable spaces.

Comments
The phrase " is bimeasurable" means that, first,  is measurable (that is, the preimage  is measurable for every measurable ), and second, the image  is measurable for every measurable . (Thus,  must be a measurable subset of  not necessarily the whole )

An isomorphism (between two measurable spaces) is, by definition, a bimeasurable bijection. If it exists, these measurable spaces are called isomorphic.

Proof
Similarly,  is measurable.

Examples

Example 1
The open interval (0, 1) and the closed interval [0, 1] are evidently non-isomorphic as topological spaces (that is, not homeomorphic). However, they are isomorphic as measurable spaces. Indeed, the closed interval is evidently isomorphic to a shorter closed subinterval of the open  interval. Also the open interval is evidently isomorphic to a part of the closed interval (just itself, for instance).

Example 2
The real line  and the plane  are isomorphic as measurable spaces. It is immediate to embed  into  The converse, embedding of  into  (as measurable spaces, of course, not as topological spaces) can be made by a well-known trick with interspersed digits; for example,
g(π,100e) = g() = .  ….
The map  is clearly injective. It is easy to check that it is bimeasurable. (However, it is not bijective; for example, the number  is not of the form ).

References
 S.M. Srivastava, A Course on Borel Sets, Springer, 1998.
 See Proposition 3.3.6 (on page 96), and the first paragraph of Section 3.3 (on page 94).

Theorems in measure theory
Descriptive set theory
Theorems in the foundations of mathematics